("Little Saint Martin") is the Trickster figure from Basque mythology. (pronounced "cheeky") means "little" in an affectionate sense. He also invented the first saws, modeling them after the edges of the chestnut leaf.

San Martin Txiki also exists in Aragonese mythology in the valleys of Tena, Ansó and Broto (places where local toponymy derives from basque) under the name .

Basque mythology
Trickster gods
Folk saints
Supernatural beings identified with Christian saints